Suh or SUH may refer to:

Suh (surname), spelling variation of surname Seo
Ndamukong Suh, American football player
Suh, Iran, village in Iran
Sudbury Hill tube station, England, London Underground station code